Microhyla, commonly known as the rice frogs or narrow-mouthed frogs, is a genus of frogs in  the family Microhylidae. It consists of 42 species of diminutive frogs. Members of this genus are widespread from Ryukyu Is. in Japan, and throughout South-east Asia, (China, Sumatra, Java, Bali, Borneo, India and Sri Lanka).

Taxonomy 
In 2021, nine species of Microhyla were moved to Nanohyla on the basis of morphological and phylogenetic differences. Microhyla pulverata was found to be a junior synonym of Nanohyla marmorata based on phylogenetic evidence.

Diagnosis
According to Seshadri et al. (2016), this genus can be diagnosed using the following set of criteria: Adult frogs are of small size; pupil circular; skin on dorsum smooth; lateral side of body with markings from back of eye to vent; supratympanic fold present in adults; paratoid glands are absent, fingers without webbing, finger tips may or may not be dilated; oval tongue, its margin is entire and free at the base; the diameter of eye is smaller than snout; a thin layer of skin hides the tympanum; tubercles on hand distinct; distinct oval shaped inner metatarsal tubercle and rounded outer metatarsal tubercle; webbing in feet, rudimentary.

Evolutionary relationships
The genus Microhyla is closely related to Glyphoglossus within the family Microhylidae. Members of the genus Microhyla began diversifying from the most common ancestor around 45 million years ago and this resulted in forming Metaphrynella and Microhyla. However, ascertaining the phylogenetic relationship of frogs within Microhyla has been difficult as many species are not monophyletic.

A 2021 study on the relationship between Microhyla and Glyphoglossus found that nine species within Microhyla actually belong to a separate lineage. They have been subsequently moved to the new genus, Nanohyla.

Species 
The following species are recognised in the genus Microhyla:

{|style="text-align:left; border:1px solid #999999; width: 55%"
|-style="background:#CCCC99; text-align: center; "
!style="width: 50%; "| Binomial Name and Author!!style="width: 40%; "|Common Name
|-
|-style="background:#EEEEEE;"
| Microhyla achatina  || Javan rice frog, Javan chorus frog, Javanese narrow-mouthed frog
|-style="background:#EEEEEE;"
| Microhyla aurantiventris  || Orange-bellied  narrow-mouth frog
|-style="background:#EEEEEE;"
| Microhyla beilunensis  || Beilun pygmy frog 
|-style="background:#EEEEEE;"
| Microhyla berdmorei  || Pegu rice frog, Berdmore's narrow-mouthed frog, Burmese microhylid frog, Berdmore's chorus frog
|-style="background:#EEEEEE;"
| Microhyla borneensis  || Borneo rice frog, Borneo narrow-mouthed frog, Bornean narrow-mouthed frog, Bornean chorus frog, long-snouted frog
|-style="background:#EEEEEE;"
| Microhyla butleri  || Butler's rice frog, Butler's ricefrog, Butler's narrow-mouthed Toad, Butler's pigmy frog, painted chorus frog, tubercled pygmy frog, noisy frog
|-style="background:#EEEEEE;"
| Microhyla chakrapanii  || Mayabunder rice frog, Chakrapani's narrow-mouthed frog, bilateral banded frog
|-style="background:#EEEEEE;"
| Microhyla darevskii  || Darevsky's Narrow-Mouth Frog, Darevsky's Pigmy Narrow-Mouth Frog (original publication).
|-style="background:#EEEEEE;"
| Microhyla darreli {{small|Garg et al'., 2018 "2019"}} || Darrel's chorus frog
|-style="background:#EEEEEE;"
| Microhyla eos  || Arunachal chorus frog
|-style="background:#EEEEEE;"
| Microhyla fanjingshanensis  || Fanjing Mountain pygmy frog
|-style="background:#EEEEEE;"
| Microhyla fissipes  || Ornamented pygmy frog, ornata microhylid frog, Malayan bullfrog, ornate narrow-mouthed frog, ornate narrowmouth frog, ornate pigmy frog, ornate chorus frog
|-style="background:#EEEEEE;"
| Microhyla fodiens  || Burrowing narrow-mouth frog
|-style="background:#EEEEEE;"
| Microhyla fusca  || Brown rice frog, Dalat pigmy frog
|-style="background:#EEEEEE;"
| Microhyla gadjahmadai  || 
|-style="background:#EEEEEE;"
| Microhyla heymonsi  || Taiwan rice frog, Heymon's ricefrog, dark-sided chorus frog, arcuate-spotted pygmy frog, Heymon's narrow-mouthed frog, Heymon's narrow-mouthed toad, burrowing microhylid frog, black-sided narrow-mouthed frog, black-flanked pigmy frog
|-style="background:#EEEEEE;"
| Microhyla irrawaddy  || Irrawaddy narrowmouth frog 
|-
| Microhyla karunaratnei  ||
|-
|Microhyla kodial 
|Mangaluru narrow-mouthed frog
|-
|Microhyla kuramotoi 
||
|-
|-style="background:#EEEEEE;"
| Microhyla laterite  || Laterite narrow-mouthed frog
|-style="background:#EEEEEE;"
| Microhyla maculifera  || Sabah rice frog
|-style="background:#EEEEEE;"
| Microhyla malang  ||
|-style="background:#EEEEEE;"
| Microhyla mantheyi  || 
|-style="background:#EEEEEE;"
| Microhyla mihintalei  || Sri Lanka red narrow-mouthed frog
|-style="background:#EEEEEE;"
| Microhyla minuta  || Tiny Narrow-Mouth Frog, Tiny Pigmy Narrow-Mouth Frog
|-style="background:#EEEEEE;"
| Microhyla mixtura  || Chinese rice frog, mixtured pigmy frog
|-style="background:#EEEEEE;"
| Microhyla mukhlesuri  || 
|-style="background:#EEEEEE;"
| Microhyla mymensinghensis  || 
|-style="background:#EEEEEE;"
| Microhyla nilphamariensis  || 
|-style="background:#EEEEEE;"
| Microhyla okinavensis  || Okinawa rice frog
|-style="background:#EEEEEE;"
| Microhyla orientalis  || 
|-style="background:#EEEEEE;"
| Microhyla ornata  || Ant frog, ornate narrow-mouthed frog, ornate narrowmouth frog, ornate rice frog, ornate ricefrog, black-throated frog
|-style="background:#EEEEEE;"
| Microhyla palmipes  || Pengalengan rice frog, palmated chorus frog, palmated narrow-mouthed frog
|-style="background:#EEEEEE;"
| Microhyla picta  || Painted rice frog
|-style="background:#EEEEEE;"
| Microhyla pineticola  || Pine Narrow-Mouth Frog, Pine Pigmy Narrow-Mouth Frog 
|-style="background:#EEEEEE;"
| Microhyla pulchra  || Guangdong rice frog, marbled pigmy frog, yellow-legged pigmy frog, beautiful pygmy frog, painted frog, yellow-legged narrow-mouthed frog
|-style="background:#EEEEEE;"
| Microhyla rubra  || Guangdong rice frog, red narrow-mouthed frog, densely spotted microhylid frog
|-style="background:#EEEEEE;"
| Microhyla sholigari  ||
|-style="background:#EEEEEE;"
| Microhyla superciliaris  || Batu Cave rice frog
|-style="background:#EEEEEE;"
| Microhyla taraiensis  || 
|-style="background:#EEEEEE;"
| Microhyla zeylanica  || Sri Lanka rice frog
|}

In central Vietnam, several new species of Microhyla have been described in the 2000s:Microhyla darevskii: Mount Ngọc Linh, Kon Tum ProvinceMicrohyla minuta: Đồng Nai ProvinceMicrohyla pineticola: Lâm Đồng Province and Đắk Lắk Province

Several new species of Microhyla have been described since 2018.

Phylogeny
The following phylogeny of the genus Microhyla is from Khatiwada, et al. (2017). 27 species are listed, including various newly described species from South Asia. 
(Note: the chart below includes some species that have since been moved to Nanohyla including N. annectens and N. perparva''.)

References

External links 

 
Microhylidae
Amphibians of Asia
Amphibian genera
Taxa named by Johann Jakob von Tschudi